Irakkandi Bridge is the third longest bridge in Sri Lanka with a length of 300m metres. It spans the Irrakkandi Lagoon linking Trincomalee with Pulmoddai. The bridge was completed and declared open on 20 October 2009 by President Mahinda Rajapaksa, along with the Kinniya Bridge. It was built with the financial assistance of Saudi Arabian government.

See also
 Kinniya Bridge
 Manampitiya Bridge

References

2009 establishments in Sri Lanka
Bridges completed in 2009
Bridges in Trincomalee District